Mathias Michel Lessort (born 29 September 1995) is a French professional basketball player for Partizan Belgrade of the Serbian KLS, the Adriatic League and the EuroLeague. He stands at 206 cm (6’9’’) tall and plays at the center position.

Early years
Born in the French overseas department of Martinique, Lessort joined the youth ranks of Élan Chalon in 2010 and won the French national championship with Chalon’s cadet team in 2012 and 2013 and with their development team ("Espoirs") in 2013. He also helped Chalon win the 2013 Trophée du Futur.

Professional career
Lessort was handed his first professional contract by the club in June 2014 and made his debut in the French top-flight Pro A during the 2014-15 season. Before turning professional, he had considered enrolling at a university in the United States and had been in touch with Gonzaga and North Carolina State.

He saw action in 23 games as a rookie, chipping in with 2.0 points a game, while pulling down 2.0 rebounds per contest. In 2015-16, he logged his first minutes in a European club competition, the FIBA Europe Cup.

In April 2016, he declared for the NBA draft, but later withdrew. On 1 June 2016 he joined JSF Nanterre of the French Pro A on a three-year deal. In April 2017, Lessort won both the French Basketball Cup and the FIBA Europe Cup championships with Nanterre.

On 11 August 2017 Lessort signed a three-year deal with the Serbian club Crvena zvezda. He played there only in the 2017–18 season, before signing with Spanish ACB side Unicaja in July 2018.

Lessort spent the 2019-20 season in Germany with Bayern Munich.

On 18 September 2020 Lessort signed with AS Monaco of the LNB Pro A.

On 25 September 2021 Lessort signed a 2-month contract with Maccabi Tel Aviv of the Israeli Premier League in order to replace the injured Ante Žižić. In five games, Lessort averaged 7.4 points and 3.4 rebounds per game. He parted ways with the team on 26 November.

On 20 December 2021, Lessort signed with KK Partizan of the Basketball League of Serbia, the ABA League and the EuroCup. On 18 July 2022, he signed a new contract with Partizan.

NBA draft rights
Lessort was drafted in the second round as the 50th pick in the 2017 NBA draft by the Philadelphia 76ers. In July 2019, his draft rights were traded to the Los Angeles Clippers as part of a four-team trade. On 19 November 2020 his draft rights were traded to the Minnesota Timberwolves. Lessort's draft rights were traded again, to the New York Knicks, on 20 November.

National team career
Lessort played in the 2013 Nike Global Challenge, averaging 19.5 points, 7.8 rebounds and 1.3 blocks a game, while receiving International All-Tournament Team honors.

He represented France at the 2014 and 2015 U20 European Championships. In 2015, he averaged 4.1 points and 5.1 rebounds en route to a semifinal appearance.

Career statistics

EuroLeague

|-
| style="text-align:left;"| 2017–18
| style="text-align:left;"| Crvena zvezda
| 30 || 29 || 21.1 || .549 || .000 || .632 || 5.7 || .8 || .8 || .7 || 8.5 || 10.7
|- class="sortbottom"
| style="text-align:center;" colspan=2| Career
| 30 || 29 || 21.1 || .549 || .000 || .632 || 5.7 || .8 || .8 || .7 || 8.5 || 10.7

Personal life
His brother Grégory Lessort is also a professional basketball player.

References

External links
 Mathias Lessort at aba-liga.com
 Mathias Lessort at draftexpress.com
 Mathias Lessort at eurobasket.com
 Mathias Lessort at euroleague.net
 Mathias Lessort at lequipe.fr

1995 births
Living people
ABA League players
AS Monaco Basket players
Baloncesto Málaga players
Basketball League of Serbia players
Centers (basketball)
Élan Chalon players
FC Bayern Munich basketball players
French expatriate basketball people in Germany
French expatriate basketball people in Serbia
French expatriate basketball people in Spain
French men's basketball players
KK Crvena zvezda players
KK Partizan players
Liga ACB players
Martiniquais men's basketball players
Nanterre 92 players
Philadelphia 76ers draft picks
Maccabi Tel Aviv B.C. players
Sportspeople from Fort-de-France